The 2017–18 season was Monterrey's first competitive season and first season in the Liga MX Femenil, the top flight of Mexican women's football.

On the Apertura 2017 tournament, Monterrey finished fourth and failed to qualified for the playoffs. For the next tournament, the Rayadas finished first during the regular season and managed to get to the championship final, where they lost against rivals UANL in penalties, in the women's version of the Clásico Regiomontano.

Squad

Apertura

Clausura

Coaching staff

Competitions

Overview

Torneo Apertura

League table

Matches

Torneo Clausura

League table

Matches

Playoffs

Semifinals

Final

Statistics

Appearances and goals

|-

|}

Goalscorers

Hat-tricks

Own goals

References

C.F. Monterrey (women) seasons
Mexican football clubs 2017–18 season